Guess Who's Comin' to the Crib? is the 1987 third album by the Brooklyn, New York-based R&B group Full Force.  This album featured the band's biggest hit as a recording act with "All in My Mind" just missing the R&B top 5.  Other hits include the near-top ten "Love Is for Suckers (Like You and Me)" and the #24 hit, "Your Love Is So Def".

Track listing
"Take Care of Homework" (6:03)  	   	
"Love Is for Suckers (Like You and Me)" (4:37) 		
"All in My Mind" (5:28)
"3 O'Clock...School's Out!" (5:22)
"Child's Play (Part 3)" (1:42)
"Full Force Git Money $" (3:39)	
"Your Love Is So Def" (5:15)	
"Katty Women" (5:02)
"Low Blow Brenda" (4:11)	
"Black Radio" (4:21)

All songs written and performed by Full Force.

Chart performance

Singles

References

External links
 Full Force-Guess Who's Comin' To The Crib?  at Discogs

1987 albums
Full Force albums
Columbia Records albums
Albums produced by Full Force